Innotek is a technology centre located in Geel, in the Campine region of Belgium. It is a public private partnership between the Antwerp province and several organisations located in the Campine region of the province.

History
The centre was founded in 1987 as a joint initiative of the Regional Development Authority for the Kempen region (IOK) and the local Chambre of Commerce. In 1988, Innotek became a European Business and Innovation Centres (BIC) and is now part of the European Business and Innovation Centre Network (EBN). In 1996 the Technologyhouse of the Kempen, a business incubator building was opened in Geel. Since 2009, Innotek also manages the Milieutechnologiehuis (E: Environmental Technology House) in Mol. Outside the incubator, several companies are located on the Innotek area, such as Genzyme Flanders, CIPAL (inter-municipal ICT service centre for the Belgian provinces of Antwerp and Limburg) and Fibre Optic Sensing & Sensing Systems, a research centre.

Activities
 Development of new business
 The creation of spin-offs
 Virtual and physical incubation
 Projects on regional economical development

See also
 Regional policy of the European Union
 Science and technology in Flanders
 Strategic Plan Campine
 Campus Blairon

Sources
 Innotek (EBN)
 Innotek (Antwerp province, Dutch)

External links
 
 Innotek 10 years (Dutch)

Flanders
Science and technology in Belgium
Business incubators of Belgium
Organisations based in Antwerp Province
Geel
1987 establishments in Belgium